The coat of arms of Saint Kitts and Nevis was adopted in 1983 and possesses the motto "Country Above Self". The previous coat of arms, adopted in 1967 by the colony of Saint Christopher-Nevis-Anguilla, was nearly identical, except for coloration and the motto "Unity in Trinity".

The centre of the coat of arms is dominated by a shield at the base in which there is a lighter in full sail. The lighter is one of the traditional means of transportation. A red chevron is highlighted by two poinciana flowers.

At the top of the shield is a Carib's head, flanked by a fleur-de-lis and a rose. The Caribs were the early inhabitants of the islands, and the fleur-de-lis and rose signify the islands' English and French influences. A helmet topped with the battlements of a tower appears with a flaming torch upheld by three hands: one black, one white, and one mixed. The torch signifies the struggle and quest for freedom by a people of diverse ethnic origins, but united in purpose.

The shield is supported on either side by pelicans (the country's national bird), with wings extended, displaying a sugar cane plant and the coconut palm tree, which are extensively cultivated throughout Saint Kitts and Nevis.

References

Saint Kitts and Nevis
National symbols of Saint Kitts and Nevis
Saint Kitts and Nevis
Saint Kitts and Nevis
Saint Kitts and Nevis
Saint Kitts and Nevis
Saint Kitts and Nevis
Saint Kitts and Nevis
Saint Kitts and Nevis
Saint Kitts and Nevis
Saint Kitts and Nevis